Joseph Dalman (31 October 1882 – 20 June 1944) was a German screenwriter.

Selected filmography
 The Gambling Den of Montmartre (1928)
 The Man with the Limp (1928)
 Almenrausch and Edelweiss (1928)
 The Women's War (1928)
 Brother Bernhard (1929)
 Left of the Isar, Right of the Spree (1929)
 When the White Lilacs Bloom Again (1929)
 When the Evening Bells Ring (1930)
 The Champion Shot (1932)
 The Master Detective (1933)
 The Hunter of Fall (1936)
 Militiaman Bruggler (1936)
 There Were Two Bachelors (1936)
 Silence in the Forest (1937)
 The Sinful Village (1940)
 Left of the Isar, Right of the Spree (1940)
 The War of the Oxen (1943)

References

Bibliography 
Giesen, Rolf. ''Nazi Propaganda Films: A History and Filmography. McFarland & Co, 2003.

External links 
 

1882 births
1944 deaths
German male screenwriters
Writers from Regensburg
Film people from Bavaria
20th-century German screenwriters